Erich Flinsch (14 July 1905 – 28 December 1990) was a German pianist and university lecturer. He was a grand-disciple of Franz Liszt (1811-1886) and student and assistant of the pianist, composer and musicologist Emil von Sauer (1862–1942) in Vienna.

Life and career 
Born in Frankfurt am Main, between 1954 and 1958, Flinsch was the successor of Walther Davisson (1885-1973) one of the three board members of the Frankfurt University of Music and Performing Arts and of the Hoch Conservatory in Frankfurt am Main, together with Gustav Lenzewski (1896–1988) and Helmut Walcha (1907–1991).

In this period, in July 1956, he was together with the physician and town councillor  (1889–1983) founder of the "Robert-Schumann-Gesellschaft Frankfurt am Main" in der Villa Bonn.

Flinsch died in Schneidhain at age 85.

Work 
 Erich Flinsch: Ludwig Schuncke, Schumann's Freund und Mitbegründer der Neue Zeitschrift für Musik. In Neue Zeitschrift für Musik 121 (1960), .

Students 
 Herbie Hess
 Alois Ickstadt
 Robert Leonardy
 Michael Ponti

Further reading 
 Otto Renkhoff: Nassauische Biographie. Kurzbiographien aus 13 Jahrhunderten. 2nd, completely revised and extended edition. Historische Kommission für Nassau, Wiesbaden 1992, .

References 

German classical pianists
Male classical pianists
Academic staff of the Frankfurt University of Music and Performing Arts
1905 births
1990 deaths
Musicians from Frankfurt
20th-century German male musicians